is a manga by Sakura Kinoshita published from August 1999 to October 2004. A television anime based on the manga series ran for 26 episodes from April 5, 2003, to September 27, 2003, in Japan.

The series originally ran in the magazine Monthly Shōnen Gangan under the name , but Ragnarok was added to the title when the series was purchased by publishing company MAG Garden and moved to Comic Blade magazine. The Mythical Detective Loki was collected in 7 volumes by Gangan Comics, which were later republished by Blade Comics; it has not been officially licensed for US distribution. The Mythical Detective Loki Ragnarok ran for 5 more volumes, which were published in Japan by Blade Comics, and picked up for translation and English release by ADV Manga. Chuang Yi has released an English version in Singapore. The anime has been licensed for English release by Section 23 Films. The anime series was broadcast in Mexico and South America by the anime television network, Animax, under the name Mythical Sleuth Loki.

Plot summary
Loki, the Norse god of mischief, has been exiled to the human world by the god Odin for reasons that he doesn't understand. Along with being exiled, Loki is forced to take the form of a human child, and the only way he can return to the realm of the gods is by collecting the evil auras which take over human hearts. In order to do this, he starts a detective agency which specializes in the paranormal. Loki is assisted by his loyal companion Yamino and the pair are soon joined by a human girl named Mayura Daidouji who is manic for mysteries and often unwittingly assists him in catching the auras. As time passes, however, other Norse gods and characters appear; some befriend Loki and others are intent on assassinating him.

Characters

Voiced by: Yuriko Fuchizaki (Japanese), Shannon Emerick (English)Adult Form - Takahiro Sakurai (Japanese), Jose Diaz (English)
God of mischief (and in some versions chaos) in Norse mythology. Trapped in the body of a child, he seeks a way back to the realm of the gods and his original body. He is the father of Fenrir, Yamino (Jormungand), and Hel. He has red-brown hair and green eyes; he also has an aversion to deep water, as well as a possibly small case of amaxophobia, since he seems to hate riding in cars. (Or perhaps he simply becomes carsick.)
Loki has many romantic interests. In both series, Freyja loved him in the world of gods but he does not like her that way. Although in the anime, Loki is shown to be happy about Freya's feelings for him (Episode 13), ever since their initial confrontation where Loki learned of Freya's loneliness because of him. The youngest Norn Sister, Skuld, is also attracted to him mostly because of his kindness and beauty. Mayura seems to have romantic feelings towards him because of his courage, intelligence and concern for her. However, Mayura is the only one of these three who doesn't know Loki is actually an age old god, thus, her affection is somewhat unclear. Another quality of Loki is that his sense of foresight is quite remarkable, as he can usually figure things out way before anyone else does (though Yamino, Fenrir, and Ecchan figured out who Spica really was long before Loki did). Loki is more wild and silly in the manga than he is in the anime (his personality more befitting his body in the manga); also his relationship with Mayura is seen more clearly. He's obviously in love with Mayura.

The main human character of the series: a pink-haired, red-eyed, 16-year-old, high school student obsessed with mysteries and the occult. Despite her love of mysteries, she never manages to find out who Loki is - partly because she has absolutely no sixth sense, despite being the daughter of a Shinto priest. Mayura also seems to have romantic feelings towards Loki near the end of the anime series. However it is shown unclearly in the manga, since she only knows him as a child. She does not believe in God because her mother died despite countless prayers. There are significant differences in her personality in the manga and anime. In the manga, Mayura is calmer, not shouting "Fushigi mystery!" (strange mystery) as often as she does in the anime and seems to have a sharper sense (being able to know Loki is "different" and wanting to ask him who or what he was in the seventeenth chapter).
Voiced by: Yui Horie (Japanese), Kira Vincent-Davis (English)

Loki's second son takes the form of a polite, bespectacled boy in his late teens, and serves as his housekeeper, cook, and assistant. He enjoys cooking, cleaning and other domestic activities, and in the anime, he also has an amusing addiction to ordering useless items from mail-order catalogs. His real name is Jormungand, also known as the Midgard serpent, since his true form is that of a giant serpent that encircles the Earth. Loki rescued Yamino from the bottom of the sea by casting a spell on him (thus giving him a human form) so that he could accompany his father on Earth; for this, he is eternally grateful. The revelation of Yamino's true identity occurs earlier in the manga than the anime, and seems to play more of a part in his characterization for the first manga series. He probably wears glasses as a reference to the Indian cobra (眼鏡蛇 meganehebi, or "glasses snake", in Japanese).
Voiced by: Shinichiro Miki (Japanese), Illich Guardiola (English)

Loki's first son takes the form of a small black dog. His real identity is that of the Fenrisulfr, a giant wolf bound by the gods. Fenrir enjoys food and taunting Yamino. A running gag in both the anime and manga is how Fenrir can be very bossy and intentionally crude around Yamino, then instantly become the most affectionate and harmless puppy-son possible the moment "Daddy" walks in (during the series, he has an almost scary Father Complex. He's very outwardly protective of Loki, spouting threats when Loki may be in danger). While the gods can understand his words, it would appear that when a human hears him talk all they hear is a regular dog (though his barking sounds like he's singing).
Voiced by: Hirofumi Nojima (Japanese), John Swasey (English)

Loki's only daughter, Hel is the goddess of the underworld. Portrayed as an adolescent girl with wavy pink hair, green eyes and glasses, and a strong obsession with her father, though the nature of it differs between the manga and anime. In the anime, she is seen to be trying to kill Loki at first as Odin told her that Loki and her brothers no longer care for her and hated her, thus, making her wanting to make Loki experience the same kind of pain she experienced. In the manga, she wishes to kill her father so that he will always be with her in the underworld.
Voiced by: Omi Minami (Japanese), Rozie Curtis (English, ep 14), Taylor Hannah (English, eps 22+)

Actually the Norse God of thunder, Thor, in the form of a teenage boy with brown hair and eyes. He was sent to Earth from the realm of gods to kill Loki; in the manga, he doesn't remember this at first, while in the anime, he chooses not to kill Loki because he sees no reason to. Unfortunately, he forgot how to return to the realm of the gods, so he is forced to work a wide array of part-time jobs to support himself, which becomes another one of the series' recurring jokes. He always carries around a wooden sword, which is actually Thor's hammer Mjollnir in disguise. Loki addresses him as Narukami, itself a double pun on god (神 kami) and lightning (雷 kaminari), as clarified by Kinoshita in the second series.
Voiced by: Shotaro Morikubo (Japanese), Chris Patton (English)

Reiya is a young girl with blue-violet eyes, brown hair and a cute crush on young Loki. In the anime, she is the sole survivor of a rich family killed in a car accident, and she hires Loki to solve a mystery about her mansion. In the manga, she hires Loki because she has been having unsettling dreams about her deceased sister Lisa; she lives with her aunt, uncle, and two older cousins. Reiya's true identity is the transmigrated Norse goddess Freyja—unlike Loki, however, Reiya's memory was wiped by Odin, so she has no memory of her past life. Reiya becomes Freyja when the necklace Brisingamen is put around her neck, but reverts to Reiya when the necklace is removed, with no memory of what happens while wearing it. Freyja, just like her alter ego, is enamored with Loki, though she's far more aggressive about it than Reiya. Reiya is also capable of becoming Freyja when extremely jealous or threatened, as well as other circumstances.
Voiced by: Rika Komatsu (Japanese), Brittney Karbowski (English)

Freyja is the goddess of love and beauty. She loves Loki, but Loki does not return the feelings. Despite this, Freya refuses to give up and does everything she can to put Loki into situations where she can take advantage of him. When Loki was banished from the world of gods, Freyja begged Odin to let him return thus making Odin furious. Odin turned her into a child, Reiya, erased all her memories and sent her to the world of the mortals. She initially hated Loki for ignoring her and not reciprocating her feelings for him, and that she was lonely because of it. However, she learned to accept it and still refuses to give up on him. Thus, whenever she takes over Reiya, she aggressively pursues Loki and keeps others away from him, in particular Skuld.
Voiced by: Junko Asami (Japanese), Shelley Calene-Black (English)

Heimdall is the god of light and the Guardian of the bridge that leads to Asgard (The Bifrost Bridge), sent by Odin to assassinate Loki, the watchman Heimdall takes the form of a young boy as a disguise. However, due to the theft of his right eye, he is forced to have neck-length purple hair that completely covers the right side of his face. His nails are actually long, sharp claws, so he wears bulky gloves to hide them. Because he is the god of strategy, he devises clever plans, such as control over other beings or even mirages to taunt the opponent. It's believed that if he and Loki clashed they would both die as the myth in Ragnarok portrayed it, so a serious confrontation is avoided until the end of the series, in which Loki convinces him that he may have lost his eye but gained a friend, the falcon that accompanied him. He believes Loki to be the thief that stole his eye, so in addition to carrying out the assassination order, he intends to retrieve his eye or avenge its loss by any means necessary. Although he is one of the more serious characters in the series, Heimdall is also the butt of many jokes. The manga frequently makes fun of his serious personality and his obsession with Loki, and even though "Kazumi Higashiyama" doesn't attend school, Heimdall still has a daily schedule consisting of piano lessons, singing lessons, and cram school. In the anime, Heimdall usually gets dragged along on shopping sprees by his roommate Freyr, much to his own dismay.
His name is very similar to Kinoshita's co-author in Tactics, Kazuko Higashiyama.
Voiced by: Romi Park (Japanese), Greg Ayres (English)

Freyr is Freyja's older brother and the god of fertility. He was brought to Earth to aid Heimdall in the destruction of Loki, but quickly drops that mission to search for Freyja once he realizes she is there, too. Somewhere along the line, he decides to get Loki's attention by becoming a master jewel thief; the natural enemy of any great detective. Impulsive and quixotic, Freyr seems to think of everything in terms of Romantic cliché, dramatic stereotypes, and absurd non sequiturs. His primary agenda is to find Freyja, or at least ensure that Loki isn't corrupting her. However, in the course of his plans, Freyr runs into Mayura, falls in love at first sight, and renames her Yamato Nadeshiko (大和撫子 Yamato Nadeshiko, a name for the prototypical ideal woman; a sort of Japanese Dulcinea), and in the English anime, his "Classic Japanese Beauty."
Voiced by: Takehito Koyasu (Japanese), Jason Douglas (English)

Verdandi, Urd and Skuld are the goddesses of fate. In the manga, they are a bit ambiguous in their loyalties. Though they help Loki often, such as by giving him the magical ring Draupnir (which can be used to store evil spirits), they have plans of their own, separate from those of Odin and the other gods. Urd, in particular, is implied to be manipulating events on her own. In the anime, they have been sent to earth by Odin to kill Loki. Most of their attempts fall into the "Monster of the Week" pattern familiar to Super Sentai shows and magical girl/magical boy anime.
In the anime, there are many strong hints that Loki had an affair with Skuld in Asgard—an entire episode is even dedicated to this question—which could be the Norns' fuel for 'hating' and helping him. It is not known for sure though. In the manga, Skuld certainly has a crush on Loki, but there are no hints of anything more serious.
Voiced by: Verdandi - Mamiko Noto (Japanese), Tamara Levine (English)Urd - Mariko Suzuki (Japanese), Kaytha Coker (English)Skuld - Mai Nakahara (Japanese), Melissa Davis (English)

Odin is the King of the Gods. Odin is only referred to, never seen or interacted with, in the first series of the manga. In the second series, he is hinted at for a while with silhouettes and frames containing parts of his clothing, but eventually is seen unobscured. In the anime, he is only shown as a red eye, but also referred to with the emergence of two ravens that, if they appear together, stand for Huginn and Muninn, Odin's two messengers (see episode 1). Odin seeks to kill Loki, but is somehow unable to do so himself, so he sends assassins instead. He was the one who commanded Loki to take Heimdall's eye. Ironically, he is portrayed as an eye, the very part he gave to get ultimate knowledge.

Spica is the reincarnation of Angrboda, the giantess who bore three of Loki's children (the ones that were a precursor to Ragnarok). She is the mother of Fenrir, Jormungand, and Hel. In her human form, Spica is a normally mute girl with a HUGE appetite. In the anime she only appears briefly in the final episode.

Utgard Loki is the "other" Loki who held half of Loki's power— Loki identifies Utgard as his past self. He is the King of Utgard, Land of the Giants. When Urd killed Utgard Loki in the manga, Loki got his power back. He seems to have a strange obsession over Spica.
Koutaro
A rich school boy and friend of Loki. In the anime he's a classmate of Mayura. He only appears in few episodes and is shown to be a ladies man, going after almost every pretty girl he sees.
Misao Daidouji
Misao Daidouji is the father of Mayura. He hates mystery and Loki but unlike his daughter, he can see some of the things that Loki summons. He is a minor character, except on episode four; My Dad's a Great Detective!?
Inspector Masumi Niiyama
Masumi Niiyamais a police investigator who occasionally runs into Loki & the gang while on a case. He is friends with Misao Daidouji.

Media

Manga
Japanese

Limited Editions

These were often packaged with special extras, such as audio drama CDs or collectible figurines.

English (North American)

English (Singapore)

Anime

Episode list

References

External links
 
 

2002 manga
2003 anime television series debuts
ADV Films
ADV Manga
Mag Garden manga
Gangan Comics manga
Norse mythology in anime and manga
Occult detective anime and manga
Odex
Shōnen manga
Square Enix franchises
Studio Deen
TV Tokyo original programming